The city of Ottawa, Canada held municipal elections on December 3, 1956.

Controller George Nelms is acclaimed as mayor, the last election in Ottawa's history where a candidate for mayor has run unopposed. Nelms was not the incumbent mayor. The incumbent was Charlotte Whitton who decided not to run again.

After four years of wards just having numbers, names were returned to each of the wards.

Mayor of Ottawa

Ottawa Board of Control
(4 elected)

City council

(2 elected from each ward)

References
Ottawa Citizen, December 4, 1956

Municipal elections in Ottawa
Ottawa
1950s in Ottawa
1956 in Ontario
December 1956 events in Canada